"Headbutt" is the first single from The King Blues' third album Punk and Poetry. It was released on iTunes on 16 May 2010. The band appeared in Kerrang! magazine shortly before its release to promote the single. The single is the first since founding member of the band 'Fruitbag' left and the first released on new label Transmission Recordings. Already the song has become a hit with fans due to the band playing it live frequently during their tour during March, April and May 2010. It reached #72 in the Official UK top 100 singles chart and #1 in the Independent Singles Breaker Chart.

Track listing

Credits and personnel 
 Writer – Jonny 'Itch' Fox, Peter Miles, Michael 'Fruitbag' Payne
 Mixer – Steve Fitzmaurice

References

External links

2010 songs
2010 singles
The King Blues songs
Music videos directed by Adam Powell